Taehŭng County is a kun, or county, in the northeastern corner of South P'yŏngan province, North Korea.  It is bordered to the north by Ryongrim and Changjin, to the east by Yŏnggwang and Hamju, to the south by Yodŏk and Chŏngp'yŏng, and to the west by Nyŏngwŏn and Tongsin.  It is drained by the Taedong River, which rises in the north part of the county before flowing west into Yŏngwŏn.

The terrain of Taehŭng is higher and more mountainous than any other part of South P'yŏngan.  Three mountain ranges, the Rangrim, Myohyang, and Puktaebong, pass through the county. The highest of the many peaks is Tongdaesan, at 2,094 meters above sea level.

Local agriculture is dominated by dry-field farming, with maize the chief crop. Lumber is sent down the Taedong River for processing. There are subterranean reserves of tungsten, gold, copper, and zinc. There are no railroads, but the county is served by roads which connect it to neighbouring towns via the mountain passes.

Administrative divisions 
Taehung County is divided into one town (ŭp), one workers' district (rodongjagu) and 16 villages (ri).

See also
List of secondary subdivisions of North Korea
Geography of North Korea
South Pyongan

References

External links

Counties of South Pyongan